Philip Vella is a Maltese musical composer. He has won the main national festivals of Malta several times such as the Malta Song for Europe, International Festival of Maltese Song (Malta Song Festival) as well as L-Għanja tal-Poplu festival. He has successfully competed in International festivals in the Netherlands (song by 'Ebonique' finishing third in the Eurofestival in 2003), finalist in the Belgian Song for Eurovision competition in 2006, Bulgaria (Best song in the 2003 edition of the Discovery song festival), Czech Republic, Slovenia, Kazakhstan (Best song in 2003 Voice of Asia), Romania (3rd placing in the 2005 edition of the Golden Stag festival) as well as six times representing Malta in the Eurovision Song Contest,  placing 2nd in 2002 in Estonia with the song "7th Wonder", in 2000 in Sweden with the song "Desire", in 2004 in Turkey with the song ‘On Again... Off Again’ and in 2007 in Finland with the song "Vertigo" that received over 31,000 televotes in Malta. For 2008 he composed the song "Vodka" sung by Morena.

He has composed jingles and signature tunes for television and radio, and computer games music. He is responsible for the soundtrack of many popular teleseriels and documentaries shown on the Maltese TV. He is also the current composer of computer game company Black Pencil responsible for popular games in Germany such as Harry Buster and Smoke Attack 2. Many of his compositions have been used in various special occasions in Malta such as the anthem used in the official celebrations to mark Malta's entry in the European Union 'Worker of the Year' manifestations, the anthem of the Games of the Small States of Europe held in Malta in 2003,  the song to celebrate  'Year of languages' in 2002 and also composed the music for the opening ceremony of the Commonwealth heads of Government meeting, held in Malta under the patronage of Queen Elizabeth II.  Other compositions include the music used for the opening ceremony of St. George's square in Valletta, and also the song ‘Dinja Gdida, which is the official song of the Community Chest Fund.

Vella has been nominated several times as Best Composer in the Malta Music Awards, and won the Best Author and Best Recording Engineer Awards.

Vella plays the guitar and has been the musical director/arranger for concerts involving Malta's leading artists.

Vella and his son Sean, a pianist/arranger, form part of a production team working on various genres and music production requirements.

Along with Gerard James Borg, Philip Vella has written six Maltese entries for the annual Eurovision Song Contest.

Eurovision Song Contest entries

Desire by Claudette Pace  (Stockholm 2000) 
7th Wonder by Ira Losco  (Tallinn 2002)
On Again... Off Again by Julie & Ludwig  (Istanbul 2004)
Vertigo by Olivia Lewis   (Helsinki 2007) 
Vodka by Morena   (Belgrade 2008)
''"Breathlessly" by Claudia Faniello   (Kyiv 2017)

Malta Song For Europe finalists

1	1994	Good-Bye	The Starbrights
2	1995	Remember The Beginning	Georgina
3	1995	Shelter Me	Incorvaja Sisters
4	1997	Love Can Do Miracles	Claudette Pace
5	1997	Walk With Me	Mark Tonna
6	1998	Listen to our Voices	Claudette Pace & The Sixth Above – 3rd Place
7	1998	Listen	Fate
8	1999	Breathless	Claudette Pace
9	1999	The Right Time	Lawrence Gray – 2nd Place
10	2000	Desire	Claudette Pace - WINNER
11	2000	Home Grown Tenderness	Tarcisio Barbara
12	2000	Let's Try Love Once More	Alwynn Borg Myatt
13	2000	Shine	Ira Losco
14	2001	Count On Me	Lawrence Gray – 3rd Place
15	2001	He's My Romeo	Nadine Axisa
16	2001	Spellbound	Ira Losco – 2nd Place
17	2002	7th Wonder	Ira Losco - WINNER
18	2002	Dazzle Me	Paula
19	2002	One Step Away	Ira Losco – 3rd Place
20	2003	My Number One	Julie & Ludwig
21	2003	One Touch	Karen Polidano
22	2003	Superstitious	Charlene & Natasha
23	2004	On Again... Off Again	Julie & Ludwig - WINNER
24	2004	Tango 4 Two	Keith Camilleri
25	2004	You're On My Mind	Lawrence Gray
26	2005	Dèjà Vu	Olivia Lewis – 2nd Place
27	2006	Amazing	Annabelle Debono
28	2007	Look At Me	Julie Pomorski
29	2007	My Love	Isabelle
30	2007	Night-Wish	Annabelle Debono
31	2007	Vertigo	Olivia Lewis - WINNER
32	2008	Casanova	Morena
33	2008	Superhero	Klinsmann
34	2008	Tangled	Jessica Muscat
35	2008	Throw Your Stones	Daniela Vella
36	2008	Vodka	Morena - WINNER
37	2009	Another Side of Me	Corazon
38	2009	Castaway	Marija Galdes
39	2009	Crossroads	Raquela
40	2009	Earth & Sky	Talitha Dimech
41	2009	Fjamma Tas-Sliem	Dario & Grecia Bezzina
42	2009	For a Moment	Derrick Schembri & Yanika Fava
43	2009	Inferno	Ludwig Galea
44	2009	Kamikaze Lover	Baklava
45	2009	Lament	Ludwig Galea ft. Fidela tal-Bambinu
46	2009	Midas Touch	Claudia Faniello
47	2009	Rock & Rise	Klinsmann
48	2009	Sexy Girls	Evita Magri
49	2009	Smoke-Screen	Jessica Muscat
50	2009	Something About You	Laura Bruno
51	2009	Typical Me	Alison Ellul
52	2009	Visions of You	Christine Barbara
53	2010	Euphoria	Baklava
54	2010	Fake	Jessica Muscat
55	2010	Fired Up	Foxy Federation
56	2010	Here I Am	Raquela
57	2010	Pizzicato	Aldo Busuttil
58	2010	Samsara	Claudia Faniello
59	2010	Three Little Words	Ruth Portelli
60	2011	Down Down Down	Jessica Muscat
61	2011	Heart of Glass	Cherise Grixti
62	2011	Moondance	Baklava
63	2011	Movie In My Mind Claudia Faniello

Malta Eurovision Song Contest finalists 
64	2012	7 Days	Danica Muscat
65	2012	Can't Get Away	Nadine Bartolo
66	2012	In Your Eyes	Lawrence Gray
67	2012	Pure	Claudia Faniello – 2nd Place
68	2012	Dance Romance Jessica Muscat
69 2013 Fall like Rome Richard Edwards
70 2013 Ultraviolet Jessika
71 2014 Oblivion Chris Grech
72 2014 Hypnotica Jessika
73 2015 Fandango Jessika
74 2015 Could Have Been Me Iona Dalli
75 2015 Love and let go Ekklesia Sisters
76 2016 The Flame Jessika
77 2016 Frontline Danica Muscat
78	2017	Breathlessly Claudia Faniello - WINNER

References

External links

Living people
Year of birth missing (living people)
Maltese composers